Austudy or AUSTUDY may refer to:

 Austudy Payment, the current Australian Government social security payment for students, paid under the Social Security Act 1991
 AUSTUDY Scheme, the former Australian Government payment for students, paid under the Student Assistance Act 1973
 Austudy Five, a group of activists in Melbourne in 1992